"Poison Ivy" is a popular song by American songwriting duo Jerry Leiber and Mike Stoller. It was originally recorded by the Coasters in 1959. It went to No.1 on the R&B chart, No.7 on the Billboard Hot 100 chart, and No.15 in the UK. This was their third top-ten hit of that year following "Charlie Brown" and "Along Came Jones".

Composition

Lyrics
The song discusses a girl known as "Poison Ivy". She is compared to measles, mumps, chickenpox, the common cold, and whooping cough, but is deemed worse, because "Poison Ivy, Lord, will make you itch". According to lyricist Jerry Leiber, "Pure and simple, 'Poison Ivy' is a metaphor for a sexually transmitted disease". The song also makes references to other flowers such as a rose and a daisy.

Cover versions
 The Dave Clark Five – 1963. It was released as part of an E.P.
 The Paramounts – as both a single (1963) and as part of a E.P. (released 1964). The single version got to #35 on the U.K. Charts.
 The Rolling Stones recorded two different versions in 1963, the first version appeared on the EP The Rolling Stones, released early 1964. The second version appeared on a 1972 compilation of the Rolling Stones called More Hot Rocks (Big Hits & Fazed Cookies).
 Billy Thorpe and the Aztecs – Australia #1/1964. It famously kept The Beatles from the #1 spot on the Sydney charts at the very moment that the group was making its first and only tour of Australia—a feat which resulted in Thorpe being invited to meet the Fab Four at their hotel.
 The Hollies - in 1963, on their first Australian LP.
 The Kingsmen - on their 15 Great Hits album in 1966.
 Manfred Mann – B-side of the 1966 single "You Gave Me Somebody to Love"
 Redbone - 1972, on their album Already Here.
 The Lambrettas – 1980. They reached #7 in the British charts.
 Bobby and the Midnites - Bob Weir - 1980. Live in concert 11/1/80
 The Romantics – on the 1985 album, Rhythm Romance.
 Linda McCartney – in 1987, and her cover was released on her posthumous album Wide Prairie in 1998.
 Young & Restless – 1988
 The Nylons – 1988, for the Stealing Home soundtrack.
 Ian Gillan & The Javelins played it in the '60s, then reunited and recorded it for the Sole Agency and Representation album in 1994.
 Hanson – on their 1995 album Boomerang.
 Meshell Ndegeocello – 1997, with slightly altered lyrics. Her cover was included on the Batman & Robin soundtrack, in which the villainess Poison Ivy is a main character. A greatly altered instrumental cover of the song by Jai Winding is heard in the film, but not on the soundtrack.
 Los Straitjackets – in 2007 released a Spanish-language cover of the song titled "La Hiedra Venenosa," on their album Rock en Español, Vol. 1.
 Giuliano Palma & the Bluebeaters – on their 2008 album Boogaloo.
 Chris Burke
 The Lords
 Los Rebeldes del Rock – a Mexican band formed in 1957 by African-Mexican singer Johnny Laboriel. Version in Spanish, "La Hiedra Venenosa", released on EP (Orfeon, 1964).
 The Puppets
 Golden Boys – in Portuguese, as "Erva Venenosa", in 1965, with the version's lyrics portraying an evil woman. Covered by Brazilian pop band Herva Doce in 1982, and Rita Lee on her album 3001 in 2000.
 Los Flippers, a Colombian rock and roll band of the 1960s, recorded a version in Spanish called "El Melenudo".
 Bleached – on their 2014 EP For The Feel.

References

Songs written by Jerry Leiber and Mike Stoller
1959 singles
1964 singles
1980 singles
Batman (1989 film series)
The Coasters songs
The Dave Clark Five songs
The Rolling Stones songs
The Hollies songs
The Romantics songs
Manfred Mann songs
Atco Records singles
1959 songs
Songs about diseases and disorders